Desadanam is a 1996 Indian Malayalam language feature film directed by Jayaraj. It won the National Film Award for Best Feature Film in Malayalam.

Plot

The plot revolves around the personal turmoil faced by the parents of a child who is to be inducted into priesthood by a  monastery. The pain of imminent separation from their only child has been beautifully portrayed by the characters played by Vijayaraghavan and Mini Nair.

The boy who led a carefree life until now has been identified as having a deep understanding of religious philosophy and scriptures at a very young age by the priests of a holy shrine. They request the family to induct the boy into priesthood to which the grandfather of the boy readily agrees to; for, he himself had aspirations of joining the shrine in the past. The parents, though not keen on parting with their child are compelled to give in on the basis of the word given by the elders of the family.

Cast
 Vijayaraghavan as Sankaran, Pachu's Father 
 Master Kumar as Parameswaran /Pachu 
 Mini Nair as Pachu's mother
 Satyabhama Pisharasyar as Muttassi 
 Unnikrishnan Namboothiri as Sankaran's father
 V. K. Sriraman as Madhavan
 Madampu Kunjukuttan as Shastrikal
 Kaithapram Damodaran as Krishnan
 Soumya Unnikrishnan as Theethikutty

Soundtrack
All the songs in the movie were well received. The music was composed by Kaithapram who himself wrote the lyrics, had a role in the movie too.

Box office
The film became commercial success.

Awards
National Film Awards
 Best Feature Film in Malayalam
 Best Child Artist - Master Kumar
 Best Audiography - T. Krishnanunni

Kerala State Film Awards
 Best Director-  Jayaraj
 Second Best Actress - Mini Nair
 Best Child Artist - Master Kumar 
 Best Male Playback Singer - K. J. Yesudas
 Best Cinematography - M. J. Radhakrishnan
 Best Sound Recordist - T. Krishnanunni
 Best Dubbing Artist - Venmani Vishnu

References

1997 films
1990s Malayalam-language films
Films that won the Best Audiography National Film Award
Best Malayalam Feature Film National Film Award winners
Films shot in Thrissur
Films scored by Kaithapram Damodaran Namboothiri